Newbold Noyes Jr. (August 10, 1918 – December 18, 1997) was an American publisher, journalist and newspaper editor.

Noyes went from war correspondent in the 1940s to editor in the 1960s. After graduating from Yale University in 1941, Noyes was editor of The Washington Star from 1963 to 1975. A longtime resident of Sorrento, Maine, he was married to Beatrice "Beppie" Noyes (July 20, 1919 – July 3, 2007) an American author and illustrator.

The Noyes family co-owned the Washington Evening Star from 1867 to 1975. His grandfather Frank Brett Noyes served as president of the Star. His father Newbold Noyes Sr. served as associate editor of the paper. In 1975, control of the Stars parent company was sold to Joe L. Allbritton, a Houston businessman. Allbritton in turn sold the paper in 1978 to Time Warner (then known as Time Inc.), which closed it in 1981.

In his 1982 book Witness to Power, John Ehrlichman discusses a letter from Noyes to President Richard Nixon sent in March, 1973. According to Ehrlichman, if the president had responded to the letter differently, it could have been the catalyst for a different outcome for the Nixon presidency.

References

1918 births
1997 deaths
American male journalists
American newspaper editors
People from Hancock County, Maine
Noyes family
Yale University alumni
20th-century American journalists